Life and Work may refer to
Life and Work (magazine), a Church of Scotland magazine
Life and Work (conference), a 1925 ecumenical conference and programme